Bezdonys Eldership is an eldership in Lithuania, located in Vilnius District Municipality, east of Vilnius.

Etymology 
The name is of Slavic origin, from Russian бездонный ("bottomless"). According to linguists, the name comes from a local hydronym Bedugnaitė and the village name written in a 15th-century Latin manuscript as Besdenayta/Besdonayta.

Nature 
The eldership is home to Skersabaliai State Geomorphological Reserve. Most of the eldership is in Neris-Žeimena Lowland, and reaches Neris River in the west. Rolling hills and flatlands dominate the landscape. Most of the area is covered by the Lavoriškės-Nemenčinė forest. The largest river is Bezdonė.

History 
Bezdonys are known historically since the 15th century, when Polish chronicler Jan Długosz noted that in 1415, Grand Duke Jogaila hunted in forests near Bezdonys. In 1516, a manor was built there, first owned by the Jesuits, and later the Educational Commission.

In the 16th century, Sigismund I the Old established the Arvydai-Bezdonys Manor and gifted it to a mint owner, and his son later gave the manor to the Jesuits. To this day, the classicist palace remains, and was privatized and restored in 2002.

In 1862, a railway line running from Warsaw to Saint Petersburg was built near the village of Bezdonys and a railway station was established there, and the village started to grow. By the end of 19th century, two factories were already operating in the area.

In 1937, a construction of a church in Bezdonys was completed.

In 1943, a Nazi concentration camp was established in a forest in the area.

The eldership was part of Nemenčinė District until 1962, when it was incorporated into Vilnius District.

In 2009, the eldership was subdivided into 9 subelderships (seniūnaitijos).

Populated places 
There are 27 villages located within the eldership, the largest of which are Bezdonys, Arvydai and Ąžuolinė.

Ethnic composition 
According to the 2011 census:

 Lithuanian - 46.5%
 Polish - 38.9%
 Russian - 8.8%

Gallery

References 

Elderships in Vilnius District Municipality